Helton Brant Aleixo Leite (born 2 November 1990), known as Helton Leite, is a Brazilian professional footballer who plays for Süper Lig club Antalyaspor as a goalkeeper.

Club career

Early career
Born in Belo Horizonte, Minas Gerais, Leite finished his graduation with Grêmio, but was released in 2010. In 2011, he joined J. Malucelli, making his senior debut on 1 May in a 1–2 home loss against Operário Ferroviário.

Leite subsequently moved to Série B side Boa Esporte, but failed to make any senior appearances for the club. On 19 January 2012, he signed for Ipatinga.

Leite made his professional debut on 7 August 2012, starting in a 2–0 away win against Bragantino. He appeared in 23 league matches during the campaign, which ended in relegation.

On 8 January 2013, Leite joined Criciúma in Série A. He made his debut in the category on 31 July, playing the full 90 minutes in a 1–1 draw at Portuguesa. He would contribute with 11 appearances during the year, again experiencing team relegation.

Botafogo
On 7 January 2014, Leite was presented at Botafogo. Initially a third-choice behind Jefferson and Renan, he became the second-choice of Sidão when Renan left in 2016 and Jefferson was injured.

Leite was again a backup option in the 2017 campaign, this time behind another new signing, Gatito Fernández. On 14 December of that year, he moved to São Caetano on loan for the ensuing season.

Boavista
On 12 June 2018, Leite moved abroad for the first time in his career after joining Portuguese Primeira Liga side Boavista. At the club, he was named the Best Goalkeeper during the months of January and February 2020.

Benfica
On 8 August 2020, Leite agreed to a five-year contract with Benfica.

Personal life
Helton Leite is the son of former goalkeeper João Leite.

Career statistics

Honours 
Criciúma
 Campeonato Catarinense: 2013

Botafogo
Campeonato Brasileiro Série B: 2015
Taça Guanabara: 2015

References

External links

1990 births
Living people
Footballers from Belo Horizonte
Brazilian footballers
Association football goalkeepers
Campeonato Brasileiro Série A players
Campeonato Brasileiro Série B players
Primeira Liga players
Süper Lig players
J. Malucelli Futebol players
Boa Esporte Clube players
Criciúma Esporte Clube players
Botafogo de Futebol e Regatas players
Boavista F.C. players
S.L. Benfica footballers
Alanyaspor footballers
Brazilian expatriate footballers
Expatriate footballers in Portugal
Expatriate footballers in Turkey
Brazilian expatriate sportspeople in Portugal
Brazilian expatriate sportspeople in Turkey
Associação Desportiva São Caetano players